The Seljuk Civil War (1211–1213) was a fight for the throne between the sons of Kayhusraw I, who was killed after the Battle of Alaşehir.

Background and Siege of Kayseri (1211-1212)

After Sultan Keyhusrev was killed in the war, Sultan İzzeddin Keykâvus ascended the throne in Kayseri on July 20, 1211. Malik of Tokat Kayqubad, on the other hand, did not agree to his brother's accession to the throne and formed an alliance with his uncle Malik of Erzurum Mugizeddin. In this alliance, he promised to give a number of fortresses and included the Armenian king Leo. When he gathered a large enough army, he besieged Kayseri, where his brother was. Sultan Izzeddin never managed to get out of the castle. At a meeting he organized one night, he offered to attack his orders by sneaking out of the castle at night and gathering soldiers from Konya. But the city's governor said it was dangerous, that they could be caught, and instead offered to separate the allies.

Then the Sultan sent Celaleddin Kaiser to the headquarters of the Armenian king with valuable gifts. Kaiser convinced the king that there was no point in meddling in the internal affairs of the state, and that the sultan would give a few places for him as iqta, and persuaded the king to give up the Siege. In addition, the Sultan said that he would not attack him and that he would give grain in the amount of 12 thousand mudd (1 Mudd=812.5 gram Wheat). That same night, Leo ordered his army to retreat and returned to his hometown. That same night, the Sultan persuaded his uncle to retreat. Mugizeddin gathered his soldiers and returned to Erzurum without informing Melik Kayqubad.

Escape to Ankara and Peace Efforts
When Melik Kayqubad saw his allies leaving one by one, he realized that he could not do anything against his brother and lifted the siege and fled to Ankara. At that time, his emir reached Niğde before him in Zahireddin and changed sides and began preparations for the attack against Malik Kayqubad. But through Sultan Kaykaus' supporters, the city's rabble revolted. Zahireddin, who did not feel safe, went to Ulukışla, from there to the Armenian payitaht Sis, and then to Haleb and he died near Aleppo. Sultan İzzeddin ascended the throne in February–March 1212 with a full-fledged ceremony in Konya at this time. Meanwhile, he tried to mend relations with the Nicaean Empire that had deteriorated due to the war. The emperor sent Seyfeddin Ayaba, who was taken prisoner during the war, to Konya with 30 thousand gold coins. Ayaba offered the emperor's condolences and gifts to sultan. Peace was achieved by sending envoys in return. On the way back, Sultan Keyhusrev's body was brought to Konya and buried in the Tomb of Sultans next to the Alaeddin Mosque.

Siege of Ankara and the Capture of Kayqubad

After Sultan Izzeddin put the state affairs in order, he sent edicts to his orders and gave the order to gather in Konya. Taking destructive machines with him, he set out for Ankara and besieged the city in the spring of 1212. But the siege lasted much longer than expected. With the intervening winter season, the siege became more difficult. However, the Sultan knew that he would not be comfortable unless this issue was resolved radically. For this, he had a madrasah built outside the castle and said that if the castle fell, rich foundations would be donated here. During the siege, this madrasah was used as a headquarters. Meanwhile, the depletion of supplies in Ankara left Melik Kayqubad in a very difficult situation. He requested the mediation of Melik Zahir, the emir of Aleppo, to reach an agreement with his brother. However, the Sultan stated that he would continue the siege unless he informed his envoy. Finally, when the spring season came and the people had no hope, the people of the city presented the impossibility of resisting to Melik Kayqubad. Kayqubad surrendered the fort on the condition that he and the people of the city be spared. The Sultan entered the city and his banner was raised on the bastions. Kayqubad, who surrendered, was taken prisoner and imprisoned in Kezirpert Castle. Also Sultan Izzeddin tried to kill his brother, but his teacher Sheikh Mecdeddin İshak prevented this.

References

Battles involving the Sultanate of Rum